Power Rangers Lost Galaxy is a tokusatsu television series and the seventh season of the Power Rangers franchise, based on the 22nd Super Sentai series Seijuu Sentai Gingaman. The series was the first to follow the Sentai tradition of a new cast with each new series.

Kendrix Morgan (Valerie Vernon), the first Pink Galaxy Ranger for this series, was killed off two-thirds through the season, marking the first time that a Ranger was killed off in the series. Kendrix was written out of the show as Vernon had left for a while to be cured for leukemia. Her treatment was successful and she returned for the season finale.

Synopsis
Set after the events of In Space, four young adults (Corbett siblings Leo and Mike, Kai Chen and Kendrix Morgan) are leaving for the space colony Terra Venture seeking a new world like Earth. They later meet mechanic Damon Henderson, and on the Moon, a tribesgirl named Maya who leads them to five mystical Quasar Saber swords on her home planet of Mirinoi. After pulling the Sabers out of a stone, Mike falls into a crevice, but not before passing his Sword onto Leo.

With the Quasar Sabers, they morph into Galaxy Power Rangers and battle space villains from two different parts of the galaxy who include Scorpius, Trakeena, Deviot and Captain Mutiny. Along the way, they discover Galactabeasts (which eventually gain the power to morph whenever needed into Galactazords) and ally with the mysterious galactic warrior Magna Defender. Though he later dies, he manages to reveal that his host body is Mike and passes the Magna Defender powers to him.

When Deviot revives the evil Psycho Rangers, the Rangers of Power Rangers in Space show up to aid the Galaxy Rangers in destroying them. During this saga, Kendrix Morgan, the Pink Ranger, sacrifices herself to protect the Pink Space Ranger and Terra Venture from Psycho Pink. Karone, sister of the Red Space Ranger Andros and former evil princess Astronema, is given the powers of the Pink Galaxy Ranger from Kendrix (who appears as a spirit), and joins the Rangers in the battle to protect Terra Venture.

Deviot later reads secret words from the Galaxy Book; sending Terra Venture and himself into the "Lost Galaxy". Here the Rangers encounter Captain Mutiny and his Swabbies. These space traveling pirates live on the back of a massive space faring dragon inside a castle. Deviot reemerges and joins the Captain's fight against the Rangers and attempts to turn all of the citizens of Terra Venture into his slaves for the purposes of mining for "Earth".The colony escapes the galaxy after Mike sacrifices his powers to keep a portal open.

After this, Deviot returns to Trakeena, but, by this time, she has learned of his treachery and tries to destroy him. She chases him through the ship and into the cocoon that Scorpius made, fusing them together and driving Trakeena insane. Using her army armed with bombs, she cripples Terra Venture and destroys the Stratoforce and Centaurus Megazords. This forces the colony's people to evacuate to a nearby planet. Trakeena gives chase but the Rangers destroy her ship by self-destructing the Astro Megaship, but the explosion leaves Leo stranded on the moon. Trakeena, who survives the blast also, albeit scarred and injured, finally reaches her breaking point and uses the cocoon to transform into an insectoid creature to enter Terra Venture's wreck and use her power to set it on a crash course to the planet below to destroy it and the people. Leo enters and soon followed by the other Rangers try to stop her, but are slowly outmatched by Trakeena's new power. She is only defeated after Leo, using his Battlizer, blasts her at point-blank range nearly destroying himself in the process. By this time the colony is nearly crashed but the Galaxy Megazord diverts its course and lands it on a large clearing in an explosion, the colonists, having feared the worse for the Rangers, are relieved and overjoyed when they come out of the explosion on the Galactabeasts. After this, the Zords reveal to the Rangers they had landed on Mirinoi and return the swords to the stone altar. This restores its petrified inhabits and, to the joy of the Rangers, restores Kendrix to life as well. After this the colonists settle on Mirinoi as the series ends.

Cast and characters

Galaxy Rangers
Danny Slavin as Leo Corbett, Galaxy Red
Reggie Rolle as Damon Henderson, Galaxy Green
Archie Kao as Kai Chen, Galaxy Blue
Cerina Vincent as Maya, Galaxy Yellow
Valerie Vernon as Kendrix Morgan, the first Galaxy Pink
Melody Perkins as Karone, the second Galaxy Pink 
Russell Lawrence as Mike Corbett, the second Magna Defender

Supporting characters
Wendee Lee as the voice of Alpha 6
Donene Kistler as Alpha 6 (Episodes 10-11)
Heide Karp as Alpha 6 (Episodes 14-15)
Michelle Tillman as Alpha 6 (Episodes 29-44)
Julie Maddalena as the voice of D.E.C.A.
Tom Whyte as Commander Stanton
Jack Betts as Councilor Brody
Betty Hawkins as High Councilor Renier
Kerrigan Mahan as the voice of the first Magna Defender
Ryan James as Zika, the son of the first Magna Defender
Paul Schrier as Farkus "Bulk" Bulkmeier
Jack Banning as Professor Phenomenus

Space Rangers 
The Space Rangers from In Space make a guest appearance in Lost Galaxy' 30th and 31st episodes ("To the Tenth Power" and "The Power of Pink") for a team-up story in each episode:
Christopher Khayman Lee as Andros, the Red Space Ranger 
Roger Velasco as Carlos Vallerte, the Black Space Ranger
Selwyn Ward as T.J. Johnson, the Blue Space Ranger 
Tracy Lynn Cruz as Ashley Hammond, the Yellow Space Ranger 
Patricia Ja Lee as Cassie Chan, the Pink Space Ranger

Villains
Amy Miller as Trakeena
Kim Strauss as the voice of Scorpius
Tom Wyner as the voice of Furio
Derek Stephen Prince as the voice of Treacheron
Bob Papenbrook as the voice of Deviot
David Lodge as the voice of Villamax
Richard Cansino as the voice of Kegler
Mike Reynolds as the voice of Captain Mutiny
Richard Epcar as the voice of Barbarax
Rajia Baroudi as the voice of Hexuba

Villains' allies

Psycho Rangers
The Psycho Rangers, the evil counterparts of the Space Rangers, are brought back by the villains of this series in episode 30 to assist them in a scheme to deal with the good Rangers - over the course of episodes 30 and 31, the Rangers are destroyed by the combined powers of the Space and Galaxy Rangers with Psycho Pink, the only Psycho Ranger to survive destruction after episode 30 with a second return (meaning she is the only member of her team to make more guest appearances in Lost Galaxy), being destroyed again and fully in episode 31, thus bringing an end to the guest appearance of the Psycho Rangers:

Patrick David as the voice of Psycho Red
Michael Maize as the voice of Psycho Black
Wally Wingert as the voice of Psycho Blue
Kamera Walton as the voice of Psycho Yellow
Vicki Davis as the voice of Psycho Pink

Episodes

Home media
In 2012, Shout Factory announced that it had reached an exclusive distribution deal with Saban for shows such as Power Rangers and Big Bad Beetleborgs. Lost Galaxy was released on DVD in August as part of a Time-Life exclusive boxed set containing seasons 1–7 of the franchise's Zordon (from Mighty Morphin until In Space) saga. The show later became available independently of the boxed set on March 10, 2015.

References

External links

 Official site
  at Fox Kids
 

 
Lost Galaxy
1999 American television series debuts
1999 American television series endings
Fox Kids
Fox Broadcasting Company original programming
1990s American science fiction television series
American children's adventure television series
Space adventure television series
Science fantasy television series
English-language television shows
Television series about colonialism
Television series about siblings
Television series by Saban Entertainment
Television series about size change
Television shows filmed in Los Angeles
Television shows filmed in Santa Clarita, California
Television series set on fictional planets
Television series about outer space
American children's action television series
American children's fantasy television series
Television series created by Haim Saban